The 1899 Spanish general election was held on Sunday, 16 April (for the Congress of Deputies) and on Sunday, 30 April 1899 (for the Senate), to elect the 9th Cortes of the Kingdom of Spain in the Restoration period. All 401 seats in the Congress of Deputies (plus one special district) were up for election, as well as 180 of 360 seats in the Senate.

It was the first election to be held after the Spanish–American War, which had seen the loss of the Spanish colonies in the Caribbean and Pacific with the Treaty of Paris signed on 10 December 1898. Spain's defeat in the war led to a major split within the Liberal Party—led by Germán Gamazo and his "gamacist" faction—, the downfall of Práxedes Mateo Sagasta's government and the appointment of Francisco Silvela as new prime minister in March 1899. A general election was subsequently called, resulting in an overall majority for Silvela's Conservative party.

Overview

Electoral system
The Spanish Cortes were envisaged as "co-legislative bodies", based on a nearly perfect bicameral system. Both the Congress of Deputies and the Senate had legislative, control and budgetary functions, sharing equal powers except for laws on contributions or public credit, where the Congress had preeminence. Voting for the Cortes was on the basis of universal manhood suffrage, which comprised all national males over 25 years of age, having at least a two-year residency in a municipality and in full enjoyment of their civil rights.

For the Congress of Deputies, 91 seats were elected using a partial block voting system in 26 multi-member constituencies, with the remaining 310 being elected under a one-round first-past-the-post system in single-member districts. Candidates winning a plurality in each constituency were elected. In constituencies electing eight seats or more, electors could vote for no more than three candidates less than the number of seats to be allocated; in those with more than four seats and up to eight, for no more than two less; in those with more than one seat and up to four, for no more than one less; and for one candidate in single-member districts. The Congress was entitled to one member per each 50,000 inhabitants, with each multi-member constituency being allocated a fixed number of seats. Additionally, literary universities, economic societies of Friends of the Country and officially organized chambers of commerce, industry and agriculture were entitled to one seat per each 5,000 registered voters that they comprised, which resulted in one additional special district for the 1899 election. The law also provided for by-elections to fill seats vacated throughout the legislature.

As a result of the aforementioned allocation, each Congress multi-member constituency was entitled the following seats:

For the Senate, 180 seats were indirectly elected by the local councils and major taxpayers, with electors voting for delegates instead of senators. Elected delegates—equivalent in number to one-sixth of the councillors in each local council—would then vote for senators using a write-in, two-round majority voting system. Following a redistribution of the 19 senators allocated to Cuba and Puerto Rico as a result of the loss by Spain of these colonies, the provinces of Barcelona, Madrid and Valencia were allocated four seats each, whereas each of the remaining provinces was allocated three seats, for a total of 150. The remaining 30 were allocated to special districts comprising a number of institutions, electing one seat each—the archdioceses of Burgos, Granada, Santiago de Compostela, Seville, Tarragona, Toledo, Valencia, Valladolid and Zaragoza; the Royal Spanish Academy; the royal academies of History, Fine Arts of San Fernando, Exact and Natural Sciences, Moral and Political Sciences and Medicine; the universities of Madrid, Barcelona, Granada, Oviedo, Salamanca, Santiago, Seville, Valencia, Valladolid and Zaragoza; and the economic societies of Friends of the Country from Madrid, Barcelona, León, Seville and Valencia. An additional 180 seats comprised senators in their own right—the Monarch's offspring and the heir apparent once coming of age; Grandees of Spain of the first class; Captain Generals of the Army and the Navy Admiral; the Patriarch of the Indies and archbishops; and the presidents of the Council of State, the Supreme Court, the Court of Auditors, the Supreme War Council and the Supreme Council of the Navy, after two years of service—as well as senators for life (who were appointed by the Monarch).

Election date
The term of each chamber of the Cortes—the Congress and one-half of the elective part of the Senate—expired five years from the date of their previous election, unless they were dissolved earlier. The previous Congress and Senate elections were held on 27 March and 10 April 1898, which meant that the legislature's terms would have expired on 27 March and 10 April 1903, respectively. The monarch had the prerogative to dissolve both chambers at any given time—either jointly or separately—and call a snap election.

The Cortes were officially dissolved on 16 March 1899, with the dissolution decree setting the election dates for 16 April (for the Congress) and 30 April 1899 (for the Senate) and scheduling for both chambers to convene on 2 June.

Background

The Spanish–American War in 1898 had seen Spain lose its remaining American and Asia-Pacific colonies of Cuba, Puerto Rico, Philippines and Guam.

Results

Congress of Deputies

Senate

Distribution by group

Notes

References

Bibliography

1899 elections in Spain
1899 in Spain
1899
April 1899 events